The Russian Sixth Army was a World War I Russian field army that fought on the Eastern theatre of war.

The 6th Army Field Headquarters was established in July 1914 at the Saint Petersburg Military District.
The task of the Army between July 1914 and December 1916 was to defend the coasts of the Baltic and White Sea, and the approaches to St. Petersburg. In August 1915, it became part of the newly formed Northern Front. With the creation of the Romanian Front in December 1916, the staff was transferred to the Danube Army in Romania, which was renamed the 6th Army. The old 6th Army units became part of the Northern Front.

Commanders 
 1912-09-01 – 1914-08-26 — General of Infantry Alexander Blagoveshchensky
 1914-08-26 – 1915-06-21 — General of Artillery Konstantin Fan-der-Flit
 1915-06-30 – 1915-08-18 — General of Infantry Nikolai Ruzsky
 1915-08-20 – 1916-03-20 — General of Infantry Aleksiej Czurin
 1916-03-20 – 1916-12-12 — General of Infantry Vladimir Gorbatovsky
 1916-12-12 – 1917-12 — General of Cavalry Afanasy Curikov

See also
 List of Russian armies in World War I
 List of Imperial Russian Army formations and units

References

Armies of the Russian Empire
Military units and formations established in 1914
1914 establishments in the Russian Empire
Military units and formations disestablished in 1917